Chrysoritis penningtoni, the Pennington's opal, is a species of butterfly in the family Lycaenidae. It is endemic to South Africa, where it is found on the high slopes of the Amatolas in the Eastern Cape.

The wingspan is 18–22 mm for males and 20–24 mm for females. Adults are on wing from October to March, with a peak in December.

References

Butterflies described in 1938
Chrysoritis
Endemic butterflies of South Africa
Taxa named by Norman Denbigh Riley
Taxonomy articles created by Polbot